Rosalie Varda (born 28 May 1958) is a French costume designer, producer, writer and actress. She is perhaps best known for producing the documentary Faces Places, directed by and starring her mother Agnès Varda, for which she received an Academy Award for Best Documentary Feature nomination at the 90th Academy Awards in 2018.

Filmography
 Costume Designer
1980: La naissance du jour'
1982: Godard's Passion1982: Une chambre en ville1984: Thieves After Dark1984: Le matelot 5121985: Parking1986: Bleu comme l'enfer1988: Three Seats for the 26th1995: One Hundred and One Nights2001: Le plafond (Short)
2003: Le lion volatil (Short)
2011: Americano Costume Department
1979: Lady Oscar (trainee costume designer)
1981: The Wings of the Dove (assistant costume designer)
1982: Le grand pardon (costumer)
2002: Love Street (costumer)

 Actress
1964: The Umbrellas of Cherbourg as Françoise Cassard (uncredited)
1973: A Slightly Pregnant Man as Une spectatrice à Bobino
1977: One Sings, the Other Doesn't as Marie (final film role)

 Producer
2011: Americano (co-producer)
2015: Les 3 boutons (short) (producer)
2017: Faces Places'' (documentary) (producer)

References

External links
 

1958 births
Living people
French women film producers
French film producers
French costume designers
Women costume designers